is a tokusatsu series created by Toei Company. The series aired from April 3, 1996, to December 25, 1996. It was originally planned to run for a full 52 episodes before being cut down to 39 due to low ratings.

Plot
The DarkZide stealthily appeared on Earth from their dying world in Dark Dimension to acquire the Larmu, human life-energy, to continue their existence. To counter the threat, Takeshi Munakata of the Cabinet Secret Service established the group SAIDOC to intercept the DarkZide. SAIDOC developed the Crystal Power needed to complete the Changérion project. However, the power was accidentally transferred into the body of detective Akira Suzumura.

Characters

Suzumura Detective Agency
  / : A happy-go-lucky, frivolous PI who ended up with the Crystal Power. His favorite food is banana parfait. He has a vast debt and loves women and gambling.
  (1-14): Akira's aid and supposed girlfriend. She eventually left Suzumura to be a kindergarten teacher.　
  (18-36) Akira's new aid. Her capability as a detective is higher than Akira's.

SAIDOC
 : Chief of SAIDOC. He is anguished that the government doesn't believe DarkZide exists. Especially, he is afflicted by financial problems, and SAIDOC's development fund is supported by his own property.
  / : The SAIDOC member originally meant to have the Crystal power. He is a serious, strait-laced man in contrast with Akira, and his sense of duty is very strong. He feels a bit of animosity towards Akira for stealing his thunder. Later in the series he gains the ability to transform himself into the Blader when he eats the "Seed of Darkness" in the form of an umeboshi. However, he reverts back when the umeboshi is digested in his stomach, and his memory of the time during the transformation disappears.
 Eri Minami: The only female SAIDOC member. A brave, willful & confident woman. She falls in love with Kuroiwa (Gawer).

DarkZide
: Queen of the DarkZide in Parallel world.
 The Sacred Cadres of the DarkZide
 : A muscular demon who assumed the guise of 
 : A toad-like demon.
 : A tree-like demon who possesses the Key Bird. Mordos is the calm one of the 3 Cadres.
: A rogue DarkZide.

DarkZide Monsters

 Gingar (01): Posed as Izumian elementary school teacher, kidnapping children to use their lifeforce to resurrect Sacred Cadres. Though killed, she succeeded in reawakening her masters.
 Shoeser (02): Posing as a lady's shoe salesman, he kidnapped his victims through the shoes he sold to them.
 Jatou (03): Abducts brides.
 Miraiza (04): A mummy-like monster who posed as the driver of a paper recycling truck. He was the first to be defeated by the Choukou Kishi.
 Insurar (13)
 Shiragar (14)
 Do Gotch (15)
 Chameleo (16)

Episodes

Cast
Akira Suzumura/Changéríon - Takashi Hagino
Akemi Tachibana - Mie Hayashi
Rui Kirihara - Yuka Matsui
Katsuhiko Hayami/Blader - Kazunari Aizawa
Eri Minami - Chika Kochihira
Takeshi Munakata - Noboru Ichiyama
Shogo Kuroiwa/Gawer - Atsushi Ogawa
Dark General Zander (Voice) - Ryūzaburō Ōtomo
Doctor Vinsue (Voice) - Tomoyuki Terai
Priest Mordos (Voice) - Toshimichi Takahashi
Kazuki Katagiri - Yutaka Hirose
Sayoko - Ayami Endō
Eureka - Mieko Kinoshita
Narration - Noboru Ichiyama, Daiki Nakamura

Suit actor
Changéríon - Jiro Okamoto

Songs
Opening themes
 by MISA
"OVER THE TIMES (English Version)" by MISA
Ending themes
 by 
 by KAT

External links
Changerion Memorial at Toei
CHANGERION UNPLUGGED at Radiotoon (Character Design)

1996 Japanese television series debuts
1996 Japanese television series endings
Tokusatsu television series
Toei tokusatsu
TV Tokyo original programming